Mohammad Saleem (born 9 September 2002) is an Afghan cricketer. He made his first-class debut on 25 February 2019, for Kunduz Province in the 2018–19 Mirwais Nika Provincial 3-Day.  He made his List A debut on 10 September 2019, for Amo Region in the 2019 Ghazi Amanullah Khan Regional One Day Tournament. He made his Twenty20 debut on 7 September 2020, for Boost Defenders in the 2020 Shpageeza Cricket League.

In February 2021, he was named in Afghanistan's Test squad for their series against Zimbabwe. In July 2021, he was named as one of four reserve players in Afghanistan's One Day International (ODI) squad for their series against Pakistan. In January 2022, he was named in Afghanistan's ODI squad for their series against the Netherlands in Qatar. The following month, he was named as one of two travelling reserves in Afghanistan's squad for their series against Bangladesh.

References

External links
 

2002 births
Living people
Afghan cricketers
Amo Sharks cricketers
Boost Defenders cricketers
Place of birth missing (living people)